Move in Spectrums is the fourth studio album by American indie pop band Au Revoir Simone. It was released on September 24, 2013 by Moshi Moshi Records and Instant Records.

The remix album, titled Spectrums, was released in 2014.

Critical reception

At Metacritic, which assigns a weighted average score out of 100 to reviews from mainstream critics, the album received an average score of 76% based on 13 reviews, indicating "generally favorable reviews".

National Post named it one of the best albums of 2013.

Track listing

Charts

References

External links
 

2013 albums
Au Revoir Simone albums
Moshi Moshi Records albums